is a passenger railway station in the city of Funabashi, Chiba, Japan, operated by the private railway operator Tōbu Railway. The station is numbered "TD-34".

Lines

Station layout
This station consists of two elevated opposed side platforms serving two tracks, with the station building located underneath.

Platforms

Adjacent stations

History
The station opened on 15 September 1956. From 17 March 2012, station numbering was introduced on all Tobu lines, with NIshi-Funabashi Station becoming "TD-34".

Passenger statistics
In fiscal 2019, the station was used by an average of 13,943 passengers daily.

Surrounding area
AEON MALL FUNABASHI
It departs from this commercial complex that AEON MALL FUNABASHI Shuttle Bus bound for Funabashi-Hoten Station
Higashi-Kaijin Station
Seven minutes' walk brings passengers to the station.

See also
 List of railway stations in Japan

References

External links

 Railway station information 

Railway stations in Chiba Prefecture
Railway stations in Japan opened in 1956
Tobu Noda Line
Stations of Tobu Railway
Funabashi